Hans Andreas Limi (born 26 September 1960) is a Norwegian businessperson and politician for the Progress Party.

Limi was a member of the executive committee of Skien city council (his home town) from 1983 to 1987. In the 1987 Norwegian local elections he was elected to Oslo city council, but he took leave from his position in 1989. He became city commissioner of finance in Oslo when he took over after Sverre Frich, Jr. in April 1991, and sat throughout the year.

Limi was the secretary-general in the Youth of the Progress Party from 1984 to 1986. He was then an office manager in the Progress Party from 1986 to 1988 and then secretary-general until May 1994. He then withdrew, shortly after the 1994 Progress Party national convention.

Limi was hired as property manager in the Olav Thon Group. He was later a development director in Steen & Strøm and from 2005 director in ICA Norway.

Limi has been a member of the Broadcasting Council. In 2011 he made a political comeback as he was elected to Bærum municipal council. In 2013, he was elected to  the Storting from the Akershus constituency.

He was the party's parliamentary leader from 2017 to 2020. 

In March 2023, he announced his candidacy for the deputy leadership, succeeding retiring Ketil Solvik-Olsen.

He is married to party colleague Vibeke Limi. The couple has three children.

References 

1960 births
Living people
Politicians from Skien
Politicians from Telemark
Politicians from Oslo
Bærum politicians
Progress Party (Norway) politicians
Norwegian businesspeople
21st-century Norwegian politicians